Epureni may refer to the following places in Romania:

 Epureni, a commune in Vaslui County 
 Epureni, a village in the commune Duda-Epureni, Vaslui County 
 Epureni, a village in the commune Ungureni, Botoșani County 
 Epureni (river), a tributary of the Mihona in Vaslui County
 Iepureni, a tributary of the Jijia in Iași County